The 2021 Judo Grand Slam Baku was held at the Heydar Aliyev Sports and Concert Complex in Baku, Azerbaijan from 5 to 7 November 2021.

Event videos
The event will air freely on the IJF YouTube channel.

Medal summary

Men's events

Women's events

Source Results

Medal table

Prize money
The sums written are per medalist, bringing the total prizes awarded to 154,000€.

References

External links
 

2021 IJF World Tour
2021 Judo Grand Slam
Judo
Grand Slam Baku 2021
Judo
Judo